NCCR may refer to:
National Centre for Coastal Research, an attached office of Ministry of Earth Sciences
 National Centre of Competence in Research, a research instrument of the Swiss National Science Foundation (SNSF)
 National Convention for Construction and Reform–Mageuzi, a political party in Tanzania
 National Council of Chain Restaurants, a division of the American National Retail Federation
 National Council of Churches Review, a journal of the National Council of Churches in India
 New Cape Central Railway, a former railway company in South Africa
 North Cork Community Radio, a former Irish pirate radio station
Non-consensual condom removal